Meninas Cantoras de Petrópolis is the name of a pioneer Brazilian musical group composed exclusively of girls, founded in 1976, in the city of Petrópolis, by maestro Marco Aurélio Xavier.

After a rigid evaluation of capabilities for Music, which starts at the early age of seven and lasts three years long studying theory and vocal techniques, following the Escolania de Montserrat method (Coro de Meninos, which began in the 9th century  at the Abadia N. S. de Montserrat, in Barcelona), the singer girl will be tested on the "ceremony of investiture" and will be chosen to integrate the choir and maybe some day will put on the "Sapatinho de Verniz" (Coat Shoe) symbol.

They also performed with most of the Brazilian musical artists, such as: Roberto Carlos, Gilberto Gil, Ivan Lins, Simone, Chitãozinho & Xororó, Sandy & Junior, Fafá de Belém, Fábio Júnior, Xuxa, Angélica Ksyvickis, Wanderléa, The Fevers, Luiz Ayrão, Wanderley Cardoso, Elizete Cardoso, Hebe Camargo, Selma Reis and Agnaldo Rayol.

They also include songs in their repertoire of international musicians such as: John Lennon, Burt Bacharach, Bee Gees etc.

In a historical meeting with the Meninas the maestro George Martin interpreted some of the great successes of The Beatles. Before a crowd of more than 100 thousand people, the live concert took place at the Quinta da Boa Vista (Rio de Janeiro), within the Projeto Aquarius. On the preface of his book of memories “SGT PEPPER'S”, he mentioned the girls and said: " ...Only angels can sing like this..."

References

Brazilian musical groups